Coal Run is a tributary of North Branch Buffalo Creek in Union County, Pennsylvania, in the United States. A few streams in its watershed are designated as impaired due to nutrients and siltation. The watershed mostly consists of agricultural and forested land. Wild trout occur within the stream.

Course
Coal Run begins near a valley in Lewis Township. It flows southeast for several tenths of a mile before entering West Buffalo Township. Immediately upon entering that township, the stream turns east-southeast for several tenths of a mile, receiving one unnamed tributary from the left. It then flows east for a few miles, receiving three more unnamed tributaries from the left. After a while, it turns east-southeast for a few tenths of a mile before turning east again and receiving another unnamed tributary from the left. The stream then flows east-northeast for several tenths of a mile until it reaches its confluence with North Branch Buffalo Creek.

Tributaries
Coal Run has no named tributaries. However, it has a number of unnamed tributaries. The stream codes of these unnamed tributaries include 19039, 19041, and 19042.

Hydrology
Various tributaries to Coal Run are designated as impaired waterbodies. The cause of the impairment is nutrients and siltation, while the source is grazing-related agriculture. The total maximum daily load date is 2015. Streams in its watershed are also impacted by E. coli and thermal radiation. The stream and a number of others in Union County have been described as "not as clean as they should be".

In 2000, row crops and streambank erosion were the largest contributors of sediment, contributing , respectively. A total of  came from hay and pastures,  came from unpaved roads,  came from low-density urban land, and  came from other sources.

Geography and geology

There is no fencing or streambank stabilization in the watershed of Coal Run.

Watershed
The stream is entirely within the United States Geological Survey quadrangle of Mifflinburg. The watershed of the stream makes up 3 percent of the Buffalo Creek drainage basin.

Agricultural land makes up 50 percent of the watershed of Coal Run and forested land makes up 40 percent. Impervious surface make up 3 percent of the watershed, though this could rise to 24 percent in the future.

History
Coal Run was entered into the Geographic Names Information System on August 2, 1979. Its identifier in the Geographic Names Information System is 1172067.

A steel arch bridge carrying T-394 over Coal Run was built in 1984.

Biology
Wild trout naturally reproduce in Coal Run from its headwaters downstream to its mouth.

Vegetated buffer strips occur along  of streams in the watershed of Coal Run.

The pathogen load of Coal Run is 7.058 × 1015 organisms per month, though this could be reduced to 6.686 × 1015 organisms per month in the future. The largest contributors of pathogens are urban areas and farm animals (6.526 × 1015 and 5.503 × 1014 organisms per month, respectively). Septic systems and wildlife contribute 1.054 × 1012 and 4.451 × 1011 organisms per month, respectively.

See also
Panther Run, next tributary of North Branch Buffalo Creek going upstream
List of rivers of Pennsylvania

References

Rivers of Union County, Pennsylvania
Tributaries of Buffalo Creek (West Branch Susquehanna River)
Rivers of Pennsylvania